The following outline is provided as an overview of, and topical guide to, India:
The seventh-largest country by area, India is located on the Indian subcontinent in South Asia. India was home to the ancient Indus Valley civilisation, and is the birthplace of four world religions: Hinduism, Sikhism, Buddhism, Jainism. India endured colonisation, eventually being administered by the United Kingdom from the mid-19th century to the mid-20th century. India became an independent nation in 1947 after a struggle for independence that was mainly non-violent resistance, led by influential figures like Mahatma Gandhi, and underwent a violent partition. India is the second most populous country with over 1.4 billion people, and is also the most populous democracy in the world.

General reference 

 Pronunciation: 
 Common English country name: India
 Official English country name: The Republic of India
 Common endonym(s): Bharat, Hindustan
 Official endonym(s): Bharat Ganarajya
 Adjectival(s): Indian
 Demonym(s): Indian
 Etymology: Names of India
 International rankings of India
 ISO country codes:IN, IND, 356
 ISO region codes:See ISO 3166-2:IN
 Internet country code top-level domain:.in

Geography of India 

 India is:
 a subcontinent
 a country
 a megadiverse country
 Location:
 Eastern Hemisphere
 Northern Hemisphere
 Eurasia
 Asia
 South Asia
 Greater India
 Indian subcontinent
 Time zone: Indian Standard Time (UTC+05:30)
 Extreme points of India

 High: Kangchenjunga  – third highest peak on Earth
 Low: Kuttanad 
 Land boundaries: 14,103 km
 4,053 km
 3,380 km including the territorial disputes along its border; McMahon Line
 including the Line of Control 2,912 km
 1,690 km
 1,463 km
 605 km
 106 km
 Coastline: 7,000 km
Indian Ocean
Arabian Sea
Bay of Bengal
 Population of India: 1,210,193,422 people (2011 census) – 2nd most populous country
 Census of India
 Area of India: – 7th largest country
 Atlas of India
 Subcontinent (Indian subcontinent)

Environment of India 

 Climate of India
 Climate change in India
 Environmental issues in India
 Ecoregions of India
 Renewable energy in India
 Solar power in India
 Wind power in India
 Geology of India
 National parks of India
 List of mountains in India/Orography of India
 Protected areas of India
 Wildlife of India
 Flora of India
 Fauna of India
 Birds of India
 Mammals of India

Geographic features of India 

 North India
 East India
 South India
 West India
 Central India
 Northeast India
 Extreme points of India

 Beaches of India
 Glaciers of India
 Islands of India
 Lakes of India
 Mountains of India
 Volcanoes of India
 Rivers of India
 Waterfalls of India
 Valleys of India
 List of World Heritage Sites in India

Physical divisions of India 

 The northern mountains including the Himalayas, which includes the Karakoram ranges and the northeast mountain ranges.
 Indo-Gangetic plains
 Thar Desert
 Central Highlands and Deccan Plateau
 Eastern coastal plains
 Western coastal plains
 Bordering seas and islands

Administrative divisions of India 

Administrative divisions of India

Administrative divisional structure of India

States and union territories of India 

States and union territories of India
 Autonomous regions of India
 Emblems of Indian states
 States and union territories of India
 By name
 States by name
Andhra Pradesh   (outline)
 Arunachal Pradesh   (outline)
 Assam   (outline)
 Bihar   (outline)
 Chhattisgarh   (outline)
 Goa   (outline)
 Gujarat   (outline)
 Haryana   (outline)
 Himachal Pradesh   (outline)
Jharkhand   (outline)
Karnataka   (outline)
Kerala   (outline)
Madhya Pradesh   (outline)
Maharashtra   (outline)
Manipur   (outline)
Meghalaya   (outline)
Mizoram   (outline)
Nagaland   (outline)
Odisha   (outline)
Punjab   (outline)
Rajasthan   (outline)
Sikkim   (outline)
Tamil Nadu   (outline)
Telangana   (outline)
Tripura (outline)
Uttar Pradesh   (outline)
Uttarakhand   (outline)
West Bengal   (outline)
 Union territories by name
Andaman and Nicobar Islands
 Chandigarh
 Dadra and Nagar Haveli and Daman and Diu
 Delhi
Jammu and Kashmir
Ladakh
 Lakshadweep
 Puducherry
 By rank
 By economic rank
 By various rankings
 By population
 By population density
 By size
 By state code
 State and territory capitals

Divisions of India

Municipalities of India 

Municipalities of India
 Cities in India
 National Capital of India: New Delhi
 Financial Capital of India: Mumbai
 Cultural Capital of India: Kolkata
 Manchester of India: Ahmedabad
 City of Diamond: Surat
 Detroit of Asia: Chennai
 Milk city of India: Anand
 Silicon Valley of India: Bangalore
 Ceramic Capital of India: Morbi
 City of Nawabs: Lucknow
 Pink City of India: Jaipur
 Big cities in North East India
 List of city and town nicknames in India
 Million-plus cities in India
 Most populous cities in India

Geography of states and territories

Demography of India 

Demographics of India
 Ethnic groups of India
 Racial groups of India
 Religion of India

Demographics of states and territories

Government and politics of India 

 Form of government: Sovereign socialist secular federal parliamentary multi-party representative democratic republic.
 Sovereign – this means an independent nation.
 Socialist – this implies social and economic equality for all Indian citizens. This guarantees equal opportunity and equal social status. The government attempts to reduce economic inequality by reducing concentration of wealth.
 Secular – practices separation of religion and state. This implies freedom to choose one's religion. The state gives every citizen the right to practice and propagate a religion of his choice, and also right to reject all religions. The state treats all religions as equal and there is no official state religion.
 Democratic – this means the government is democratically elected, and the head of the government (prime minister) is elected by the people.
 Republic – this means the head of the state (president) is not a hereditary monarch but indirectly elected by the people.
 Capital of India: New Delhi
 Elections in India
1951  1957  1962  1967  1971  1977  1980  1984  1989  1991  1996  1998  1999  2004  2009  2014 | 2019
 Political parties in India
Aam Aadmi Party 
 All India Trinamool Congress 
 Bahujan Samaj Party 
 Bharatiya Janata Party 
 Communist Party of India 
 Communist Party of India (Marxist) 
 Dravidian parties 
Dravida Munnetra Kazhagam 
 All India Anna Dravida Munnetra Kazhagam 
 Pattali Makkal Katchi 
 Marumalarchi Dravida Munnetra Kazhagam 
 Naam Tamilar Katchi 
 Desiya Murpokku Dravida Kazhagam 
 Indian National Congress 
 Janata Dal (United) 
 Maharashtra Navnirman Sena 
 Nationalist Congress Party 
 Samajwadi Party 
 Shiromani Akali Dal 
 Shivsena 
 Rashtriya Janata Dal 
 Telugu Desam Party 
 Telangana Rashtra Samithi 
 Yuvajana Sramika Rythu Congress Party YSRCP 
 Political scandals in India
 Taxation in India

Socio-economic issues in India 
 Religious violence in India

 Katchatheevu Issue
 Religious tolerance in India
 Terrorism in India
 Naxalism
 Caste system in India
 Caste politics in India
 Caste-related violence in India
 Reservation in India
 Human rights in India
 LGBT rights in India
 Freedom of religion in India

Branches of the government of India

Executive of the government of India 
 Head of state: President of India
 Vice-President of India
 The Cabinet
 Head of government: Prime Minister of India
 Head of the civil services: Cabinet Secretary of India

Legislature of the government of India 

 Parliament of India
 Rajya Sabha (Council of States) – upper house of the parliament (Vice-President of India serves as the Chairman of the Rajya Sabha)
 Lok Sabha (House of the People) – lower house of the parliament (Speaker)

Judiciary of the government of India 

 Supreme Court of India (Chief Justice of India)
 List of high courts in India
 District Courts of India

Foreign relations of India

International organisation membership 
The Republic of India is a member of:

Law and order in India 

 Cannabis in India
 Capital punishment in India
 Company Law in India
 Indian Contract Act, 1872
 Constitution of India
 Basic Structure
 Directive Principles
 Fundamental Rights 
 Fundamental Duties
 Criminal Law in India
 Indian Penal Code
 Code of Criminal Procedure (India)
 Indian tort law
 Property Law in India
 Crime in India
 Bride burning
 Organised crime in India
 Eve teasing
 Female foeticide in India
 Rape in India
 2012 Delhi gang rape case
 Directive Principles in India
 Dowry law in India
 Fundamental Rights in India
 History of Indian law
 Law enforcement in India
 Nationality Law in India
 Labour Law in India
 List of prisons in India
 Prisons in India

National law enforcement agencies 
 Ministry of Home Affairs (Minister of Home Affairs • Home Secretary)
All India Service for policing — Indian Police Service
 Border Security Force
 Central Bureau of Investigation
 Central Industrial Security Force
 Central Reserve Police Force
 Defence Security Corps
 Directorate of Revenue Intelligence
 Indian Coast Guard
 Indo-Tibetan Border Police
 National Security Guards
 Railway Protection Force
 Special Protection Group
 Narcotics Control Bureau

State police forces

Police commissionerates 
 Vijayawada City Police
 Hyderabad City Police
 Visakhapatnam City Police
 Bangalore City Police
 Greater Chennai Police
 Delhi Police
 Kolkata Police
 Mumbai Police
 Nagpur Police

Armed forces of India 

 Command
 Commander-in-chief: President of India
 Ministry of Defence of India
 Minister of Defence
 Defence Secretary
 Strategic Nuclear Command
 Strategic Forces Command
 Chief of Army Staff of the Indian Army
 Chief of Naval Staff of the Indian Navy
 Chief of Air Staff of the Indian Air Force
 Forces
 Army: Indian Army
 Army ranks and insignia of India
 Navy: Indian Navy
 Naval ranks and insignia of India
 Indian Ocean Naval Symposium (website)
 Air Force: Indian Air Force
 Air Force ranks and insignia of India
 Indian Coast Guard
 Special forces: Special Forces of India
 Indian Peace Keeping Force
 Paramilitary forces of India
 National Security Guard
 Special Protection Group
 Military academies in India
 India and weapons of mass destruction
 Integrated Guided Missile Development Program

Government of states 
 Governor
 Chief minister
 Chief secretary
 Vidhan Sabha
 Vidhan Parishad
 Zilla Parishad
 Panchayati Raj

Politics by states and territories

History of India

History of India by period 
 Prehistoric India
 Riwatian people (1,900,000 BC)
 Soanian people (500,000 BC)
 South Asian Stone Age (70,000–3300 BCE)
 Ancient India
 Ancient Indian cities
 Indus Valley civilization (3300–1700 BCE)
 Late Harappan culture (1700–1300 BCE)
 Vedic period (1700–500 BCE)
 Iron Age (1200–300 BCE)
 Mahajanapadas (700–300 BCE)
 Magadha Empire
 Haryanka dynasty (684–413 BCE)
 Shishunaga dynasty (413–345 BCE)
 Nanda dynasty (424–321 BCE)
 Maurya Empire (322- 185 BCE)
 Middle kingdoms of India (250 BCE–1279 CE)
 Chola Empire (250 BCE–1070 CE)
 Satavahana (230 BCE–220 CE)
 Shunga Empire (185–75 BCE)
 Kushan Empire (60–240 CE)
 Gupta Empire (280–550 CE)
 Pala Empire (750–1174 CE)
 Rashtrakuta (753–982 CE)
 Islamic empires in India (1206–1596)
 Delhi Sultanate (1206–1596)
 Deccan Sultanates(1490–1596)
 Hoysala Empire (1040–1346)
 Ahom Kingdom (1228–1826)
 Vijayanagara Empire (1336–1646)
 Mughal Empire (1526–1858)
 Maratha Empire (1674–1818)
 Colonial India (1858–1947)
 British Raj
 Princely states
 Indian independence movement
 Quit India Movement
 Partition of India (1947)
 History of Republic of India (1947–present)

History of India by region

History of India by subject 

 Economic history of India
 Economy of India under the British Raj
 History of Buddhism in India
 History of clothing in India
 History of education in the Indian subcontinent
 History of Hinduism
 History of Indian archaeology
 History of Indian football
 History of the India national football team
 History of Indian influence on Southeast Asia
 History of Indian Institutes of Technology
 History of railways in India
 History of sex in India
 History of the Indian cricket team
 History of the rupee
 Indian maritime history
 Indian natural history
 LGBT history in India
 Linguistic history of India
 List of massacres in India
 Military history of India
 History of the Indian Air Force
 Peopling of India
 Science and technology in ancient India
 Slavery in India
 Timeline of major famines in India during British rule
 History of Dravidian people

Culture of India 

 Caste system in India
 Indian dress
 Festivals in India
 Humour in India
 Media in India
 National symbols of India
 Coat of arms of India
 Flag of India
 National anthem of India
 Public holidays in India
 Religion in India
 Hinduism in India
 Dravidian in india
 Islam in India
 Buddhism in India
 Christianity in India
 Judaism in India
 Jainism in India
 Sikhism in India
 Zoroastrianism in India
 Baháʼí Faith in India
 World Heritage Sites in India

Cuisine of India 

 Main dishes
 Sweets and desserts
 Drinks
 Snacks
 Spices
 Condiments
 History
 Supermarket chains in India
 Fast food

Cuisine by regions 

 East Indian cuisine
 Assamese
 Bengali
 Bihari
 Odiya
 Sikkimese
 Assamese
 Tripuri
 Naga

 North Indian cuisine
 Punjabi
 Uttar Pradeshi
 Rajasthani
 Mughlai
 Pahadi
 Bhojpuri
 Benarasi
 Kashmiri
 Sindhi
 Awadhi
 Haryanvi

 South Indian cuisine
 Malabar
 Kerala
 Tamil
 Andhra
 Karnataka
 Telangana
 Hyderabadi 
 Mangalorean
 Chettinad
 Udupi
 Coorg
 Rayalseema cuisine

 West Indian cuisine
 Goan
 Gujarati
 Maharashtrian/Marathi
 Malvani/Konkani
 Parsi

The arts in India 
 Art in India
 Comics in India
Webcomics in India
 Television in India
 Theatre in India
 Indian classical dance
 Dance forms of Andhra Pradesh

Architecture of India 

Hindu temple architecture
Buddhist architecture
Indian rock-cut architecture
Indian vernacular architecture
Dravidian Architecture
Hemadpanthi
Western Chalukya Architecture
Badami Chalukya Architecture
Rajasthani architecture
Architecture of Karnataka
Architecture of Bengal
Hoysala architecture
Vijayanagara architecture
Kalinga Architecture
Mughal architecture
Indo-Islamic architecture
Indo-Saracenic Revival architecture
Chandigarh
List of Indian architects

Cinema of India 

 Lists of Indian films
 List of Indian documentary films
 List of highest-grossing Bollywood films
 List of Bhojpuri films
 List of Marathi films
 List of Assamese films
 List of Tamil-language films
 List of Telugu-language films
 List of Malayalam films
 List of Kannada films
 List of Bengali films
 List of Indian film actresses
 List of Indian film actors
 List of Indian film directors
 List of Indian film choreographers
 List of Indian film cinematographers
 List of Indian film score composers
 List of film festivals in India
 List of Indian film producers
 List of Indian film screenwriters

Film Awards 
 National Film Awards
 Filmfare Awards
 Stardust Awards
 Star Screen Awards
 Bollywood Movie Awards
 Global Indian Film Awards
 IIFA Awards
 Zee Cine Awards
 Nandi Awards
 Karnataka State Film Awards

Cinema by region

Music of India 

 Indian classical music
 Hindustani classical music
 Carnatic classical music
 Indian folk music
 Bhavageete
 Bhangra (music)
 Lavani
 Dandiya
 Baul music
 Qawwali
 Indian pop
 Indian hip hop
 Filmi
 Indian rock
 Sangeet Natak Akademi
 Thyagaraja Aradhana
 Cleveland Thyagaraja Aradhana
 Chembai sangeetha utsavam
 List of Indian playback singers
 Indian musical instruments

Music by states and territories

Literature of India 

 List of Indian poets
 List of Indian authors
 Indian epic poetry
 Jnanpith award
 Sahitya Akademi Award
 Indian Literature (journal)
 Indian folklore

Literature by language

Languages in India

Sports in India 

 India at the Olympics
 India at the Commonwealth Games
 India at the Asian Games
 India at the Lusofonia Games
 Traditional sports of India
 Wrestling in India
 Field hockey in India
 Cricket in India
 Football in India
 Kabaddi
 Rugby in India
 Indian martial art
 Sports in Delhi

Major Sports Leagues 

 Hockey India League (Hockey)
 Indian Premier League (Cricket)
 I-League (Football)
 Indian Super League (Football)
 Indian Badminton League (IBL) (Badminton)
 Pro Kabaddi (Kabaddi)
 Ultimate Table Tennis (Table Tennis
 World Divyang T10 (Physically challenged Cricket)
 Ultimate Kho Kho (Kho-Kho)

Culture by region

Economy and infrastructure of India 

 Economic rank, by nominal GDP (2011): 9th (twelfth)

 Agriculture in India
 Animal husbandry in India
 Fishing industry in India
 Forestry in India
 Banking in India
 Banks in India
 Reserve Bank of India
 Bombay Stock Exchange
 Communications in India
 Amateur radio in India
 Internet in India
 Asia-Pacific Network Information Centre

 Companies of India
Currency of India: Rupee
ISO 4217: INR
 Economic development in India
 Economic history of India
 Economic Survey of India
 Energy in India
 Finances of India
 Finance minister of India
 Finance Commission of India
 Five-Year Plans of India
 Union budget of India
 Taxation in India
 Central Excise (India)

 Health care in India
 Mining in India
 Poverty in India
 National Stock Exchange of India
 Tourism in India
 Transport in India
 Airports in India
 Automobile industry in India
 Inland waterways of India
 Ports in India
 Rail transport in India
 Roads in India
 Water supply and sanitation in India

Economy & infrastructure of states

Education in India

Education in states

Tourism in India

Tourism in states 

List of tourism in different states of India

See also 

 List of international rankings
 Member state of the Commonwealth of Nations
 Member state of the Group of Twenty Finance Ministers and Central Bank Governors
 Member state of the United Nations
 Outline of Asia
 Outline of geography

References

External links 

 

 Government
 Official entry portal of the Government of India
 Official directory of Indian Government websites

 General reference
 India. The World Factbook. Central Intelligence Agency.
 Encyclopædia Britannica entry on India
 BBC country profile of India
 Library of Congress Country Studies entry on India

 Other
 Incredible India – The Official Tourism Website of Ministry of Tourism, Government of India
 Ministry of Petroleum and Natural Gas
 
 India 4You – Directory of popular Indian websites.

 
 
India
Tourism in India